Kerry Home Industrial School for Protestant Boys was an industrial school for protestant boys, Princes Quay (Street), in Tralee, Co. Kerry, founded in 1872. The Rev. Raymond Orpen, the Rector of Tralee (and future Bishop of Limerick, Ardfert and Aghadoe) was the manager of the school.  The school was managed in connection with the  Board of National Education, and subject to the District Inspector of the Board, E. Dowling, esq. As well as school subjects and music, boys were taught tailoring and knitting.

In 1885 when the school was closed, boys were transferred to the Meath Protestant Industrial School for Boys in Blackrock, Dublin.

References

Industrial schools in the Republic of Ireland
Defunct schools in the Republic of Ireland
Schools in County Kerry
1872 establishments in Ireland
1885 disestablishments in Ireland